Ede may refer to:

Places 

 Ede, Netherlands
 Ede, Osun, Nigeria

People 
 E De people of Vietnam

Given name 

 Ede Dunai (born 1949), Hungarian footballer
 Ede Kallós (1866–1950), Hungarian sculptor
 Ede Komáromi (1928–2006), Hungarian basketball player
 Ede Király (1926–2009), Hungarian figure skater
 Ede Magyar (1877–1912), Hungarian architect
 Ede Poldini (1869–1957), Hungarian composer
 Ede Reményi (1828–1898), Hungarian violinist
 Ede Szigligeti (1814–1878), Hungarian dramatist
 Ede Telcs (1872–1948), Hungarian sculptor
 Ede Teller (1908–2003), Hungarian-American physicist
 Ede Tomori (1920–1997), Hungarian photographer
 Ede Vadászi (1923–1995), Hungarian basketball player
 Ede Višinka (born 1972), Serbian footballer

Surname 

 Amatoritsero Ede (born 1963), Nigerian-Canadian poet
 Basil Ede (1931–2016), English wildlife artist
 Charles Ede (1921–2002), British publisher, founder of the Folio Society
 Charles Montague Ede (1865–1925), Hong Kong Businessman
 Dennis Ede (1931–2021), British Anglican priest
 Chinedu Ede (born 1987), German footballer of Nigerian descent
 George Ede (1834–1870), English cricketer
 George Ede (biathlete) (1940–2012), Canadian biathlete
 Graeme Ede (born 1960), New Zealand sport shooter
 James Ede (born 1984), English cricketer
 James Chuter Ede (1882–1965), British educationist and Labour politician, Home Secretary (1945–51)
 Jan Willem van Ede (born 1963), Dutch football goalkeeper
 Jim Ede (1895–1990), a British art collector and patron
 Piers Moore Ede (born 1975), British writer

Languages 
 Ede language, spoken in Benin and Togo
 Rade language, also known as Êđê, spoken in Vietnam

Other uses 
 Eating Disorder Examination Interview
 Ede the God, a character in the science fiction trilogy A Requiem for Homo Sapiens
 European Day of the Entrepreneur
 Europe–Democracy–Esperanto, a European electoral list